The following is a list of box sets released by The Criterion Collection.

Boxed sets and compilations

Numbered

Unnumbered

Essential Art House boxed sets 

 VIII Three Documentaries includes The Great Chase (1962), The Love Goddesses (1965), and Paul Robeson: Tribute to an Artist (1979) and was released only in the Essential Art House: 50 Years of Janus Films box set.

Eclipse boxed sets 

The following is a chronological list of DVD box sets that have been released by The Criterion Collection through its Eclipse line. The brand debuted on March 27, 2007. The sets contain between two and seven films and focus on a specific director, film studio, or theme.  The list is ordered by series number, which have been released sequentially. The films within each set are ordered chronologically by original theatrical or television release date.

Other boxed sets 

 IX Murderous Maids was released only in the 10 Years of Rialto Pictures box set.

 X Madadayo was released only in the AK 100: 25 Films by Akira Kurosawa box set.

References

External links 
 Official list

Lists of films by home video label
The Criterion Collection